Hazlina Abdul Halim (born on the 17 February 1985) is a Singaporean television presenter, editor, journalist, news reader, simultaneous interpreter and radio announcer.  Hazlina is of mixed parentage and is effectively bilingual in English and Bahasa Melayu. She is also conversant in Mandarin. She often fronts live variety and current affairs programmes and telethons. Hazlina is also often sought after for private emceeing engagements and has attended various seminars/workshop as a guest speaker. She was presenting the news Berita on Suria and was the Assignments Editor for Channel News Asia.

Early life 
Hazlina was born in Singapore. An avid reader since young, she has always been linguistically inclined and won numerous book prizes in primary and secondary school with honours in debates and oratorical competitions. Hazlina went on to pursue a diploma in Mass Communication at Ngee Ann Polytechnic where she co-presented and co-produced weekly radio programmes for Radio Heatwave, the campus radio station.

Following her graduation from Ngee Ann Polytechnic, she spent some time working as a presenter and a television journalist in Singapore before deciding  to read Political Science and Communication Studies at The University of Western Australia in 2006.  In 2010, she was conferred a Master of Film and Television with Distinction from Curtin University of Technology in Perth.

Career 
Hazlina's media career began with an internship at Ria 89.7FM during her final year at Ngee Ann Polytechnic. She was talent-scouted to be a part-time announcer affectionately known as "Fairlady".  Shortly after, Hazlina debuted on MediaCorp Suria in 2005 on TGIF - weekly magazine programme covering current affairs, lifestyle, music, food and community events.

Barely three months into her television debut, Hazlina presented Pesta Perdana 2005 - a live award show honouring Singapore's Malay Television Industry together with Najip Ali, Rima Melati Adams and Khairudin Saharom.

In October 2005, Hazlina began presenting Berita, MediaCorp Suria's prime-time news bulletin,. She joined the news team as a journalist in February 2006 before leavingto pursue her bachelor's degree. Although she was based in Perth, Western Australia, Hazlina would return to Singapore frequently during her vacation periods and was often seen reporting/presenting on Berita and various other programmes on MediaCorp Suria.

Hazlina lectured at Temasek Polytechnic's School of Business, with the Diploma of Communications and Media Management and concurrently presenting the Malay news programme, Berita on Suria.

She joined CNA in 2015 as Assignments Editor and led the news coverage planning at Singapore Desk. She continued to present Berita on Fridays.

After a 15 year career in the media, Hazlina make a career switch into Public Affairs.

On 5 December 2020, Hazlina was appointed the President of Persatuan Pemudi Islam Singapura (PPIS), also known as the Singapore Muslim Women’s Association. PPIS is a non-profit organisation that supports less-privileged Muslim women, children and families through a series of community programmes. Hazlina took over from Mdm Rahayu Mohamad, who became PPIS' Immediate Past President.

Selected Television Credits 
 2007–present: Berita - Presenter
 2005 - 2007: Berita - Presenter/Journalist
 2011: Untukmu Sinaran Hati - Presenter
 2010 - 2011: Kuiz Xpres - Presenter
 2010: Bridging Minds (MediaCorp okto/Radio Television Brunei) - Presenter
 2008: VIVA! (Aurora Channel, Foxtel, Australia) -Producer
 2008: Rapsodi LIVE! (MediaCorp Suria/Radio Television Brunei, Singapore/Bandar Seri Begawan) - Presenter
 2008: Sinaran Hati Klasik (MediaCorp Suria) - Presenter
 2007: Sinaran Hati Presenter
 2007: FYI (MediaCorp Suria) - Guest
 2005: Muzika Ekstravaganza II (MediaCorp Suria/Radio Television Malaysia, Singapore/Penang, Malaysia) - Presenter
 2005: Titian Minda' (MediaCorp Suria/Radio Television Brunei/Bandar Seri Begawan) - Presenter
 2005: Bridging Minds (MediaCorp Arts Central/Radio Television Brunei/Bandar Seri Begawan) - Presenter
 2005: Pesta Perdana - Presenter
 2005: TGIF'' - Segment Presenter

References

1985 births
Living people
Singaporean women television presenters
Singaporean women journalists
Singaporean television journalists
Singaporean people of Malay descent